Jacob Alrights was an American politician. He served as the seventh mayor of Lancaster, Pennsylvania in 1855.

References

Mayors of Lancaster, Pennsylvania